The women's 52 kg competition in judo at the 2022 Mediterranean Games was held on 29 June at the Mohammed Ben Ahmed Convention Centre in Oran.

Results

Main bracket

Repechage

References

External links
 

W52
2022
Mediterranean W52